Mary Ann Cohen (born July 16, 1943 in Albuquerque, New Mexico) is an American lawyer who serves as a senior judge of the United States Tax Court.

Cohen attended public schools in Los Angeles before earning a Bachelor of Science from the University of California at Los Angeles in 1964 and a Juris Doctor from the University of Southern California Law School in 1967. From 1959 to 1966 she was a bookkeeper and later secretary for two family owned businesses in Los Angeles. From 1966 to 1967 she was a legal researcher for multiple lawyers based in Los Angeles. Cohen then practiced law in Los Angeles with the law firm of Abbott & Cohen from 1967 to 1982.

Cohen was appointed by Ronald Reagan as Judge, United States Tax Court, on September 24, 1982, for a term ending September 23, 1997. She served as Chief Judge from June 1, 1996 to September 23, 1997, and was reappointed by Bill Clinton on November 7, 1997, for a term ending November 6, 2012. She served again as Chief Judge from November 7, 1997 to May 31, 2000. She took senior status on October 1, 2012. Barack Obama nominated Tamara W. Ashford of Virginia to the U.S. Senate for a fifteen-year term, to succeed her.

Memberships and activities
American Bar Association, Section of Taxation, and Continuing Legal Education activities.
Received Dana Latham Memorial Award from Los Angeles County Bar Association Taxation Section, May 30, 1997
Jules Ritholz Memorial Merit Award from ABA Tax Section Committee on Civil and Criminal Tax Penalties, 1999.

References

Nominations of David L. Aaron, Mary Ann Cohen, Margaret Ann Hamburg, M.D., Stanford G. Ross, Ph.D., and David W. Wilcox, Ph.D. : hearing before the Committee on Finance, United States Senate, One Hundred Fifth Congress, first session, on the nominations of David L. Aaron, to be Under Secretary of Commerce for International Trade, ... Cohen ... U.S. Tax Court, ... Hamburg ... Health and Human Services, ... Ross ... Social Security Advisory Board, ... Wilcox ... Treasury, October 29, 1997. 4.F 49:S.HRG.105-698 (1998) 

Material on this page was copied from the website of the United States Tax Court, which is published by a United States government agency, and is therefore in the public domain.

1943 births
Living people
20th-century American judges
20th-century American women judges
21st-century American judges
21st-century American women judges
Judges of the United States Tax Court
People from New Mexico
United States Article I federal judges appointed by Bill Clinton
United States Article I federal judges appointed by Ronald Reagan
USC Gould School of Law alumni
University of California, Los Angeles alumni